The Kelvin transform is a device used in classical potential theory to extend the concept of a harmonic function, by allowing the definition of a function which is 'harmonic at infinity'. This technique is also used in the study of subharmonic and superharmonic functions.

In order to define the Kelvin transform f* of a function f, it is necessary to first consider the concept of inversion in a sphere in Rn as follows.

It is possible to use inversion in any sphere, but the ideas are clearest when considering a sphere with centre at the origin.

Given a fixed sphere S(0,R) with centre 0 and radius R, the inversion of a point x in Rn is defined to be 

Under this inversion, spheres are transformed into spheres, and the exterior of a sphere is transformed to the interior, and vice versa.

The Kelvin transform of a function is then defined by:

If D is an open subset of Rn which does not contain 0, then for any function f defined on D, the Kelvin transform f* of f with respect to the sphere S(0,R) is

One of the important properties of the Kelvin transform, and the main reason behind its creation, is the following result:

Let D be an open subset in Rn which does not contain the origin 0. Then a function u is harmonic, subharmonic or superharmonic in D if and only if the Kelvin transform u* with respect to the sphere S(0,R) is harmonic, subharmonic or superharmonic in D*.

This follows from the formula

See also

William Thomson, 1st Baron Kelvin
Inversive geometry
Spherical wave transformation

References
 William Thomson, Lord Kelvin (1845) "Extrait d'une lettre de M. William Thomson à M. Liouville", Journal de Mathématiques Pures et Appliquées 10: 364–7
 William Thompson (1847) "Extraits deux lettres adressees à M. Liouville, par M. William Thomson", Journal de Mathématiques Pures et Appliquées 12: 556–64
 
 
 
 John Wermer (1981) Potential Theory 2nd edition, page 84, Lecture Notes in Mathematics #408 

Harmonic functions
Transforms
Transform